Tolipir is a hilltop area situated in Tehsil Rawalakot in the Poonch District of Azad Kashmir. Its approximate elevation is about 8800 ft above sea level. It is about 30 km, or a 120-minute drive, from Rawalakot in Azad Kashmir. Abbaspur, Bagh and Poonch River can be viewed from Toli Pir.

Tolipir is the highest mountainous location in the northeastern area of Rawalakot; it is the point of origin of three different mountain ridges. The tourist rest house on the way to Toli Pir is also situated in a scenic location. There are some remains of an old mazar on the highest hilltop.

Tolipir is most accessible during the summer months; the weather generally becomes colder from October through March.

External links 

 Official Web Site of Azad Kashmir

References

Hill stations in Pakistan
Hills of Pakistan
Populated places in Poonch District, Pakistan
Rawalakot
National parks of Pakistan
Tourist attractions in Azad Kashmir
Landforms of Azad Kashmir